Sir Thomas O'Brien (17 August 1900 – 5 May 1970) was a British trade unionist and Labour Party politician. He was also a Member of Parliament (MP) from 1945 to 1959.

O'Brien worked as a stage electrician. In 1932 he replaced Hugh Roberts as General Secretary of the National Association of Theatrical and Kine Employees. He held the post until his death, and was a member of the TUC's International Committee. He was elected at the 1945 general election as the MP for Nottingham West, and after that constituency's abolition in boundary changes, he was re-elected at the 1950 general election for the new Nottingham North West seat.  That constituency was in turn abolished for the 1955 general election, and that is when he was returned to the House of Commons for the re-established Nottingham West seat.

Quotations
"[Britons] would rather take the risk of civilizing communism than being kicked around by the unlettered pot-bellied money magnates of the United States" (quoted by The New York Times, 23 August 1949, p. 4.

References

External links 
 

1900 births
1970 deaths
Labour Party (UK) MPs for English constituencies
UK MPs 1945–1950
UK MPs 1950–1951
UK MPs 1951–1955
UK MPs 1955–1959
Members of the General Council of the Trades Union Congress
Presidents of the Trades Union Congress
General secretaries of British trade unions
Knights Bachelor